The 1922 Drake Bulldogs football team was an American football team that represented Drake University as a member of the Missouri Valley Conference (MVC) during the 1922 college football season. In its second season under head coach Ossie Solem, the team compiled a 7–0 record (4–0 against MVC opponents), tied with Nebraska for the MVC championship, and outscored opponents by a total of 155 to 26.

The 1922 season remains the only undefeated season in Drake football history. The team's victories included games against Kansas (6–0), Iowa State (14–7), Colorado Agricultural (19–6), and Mississippi A&M (48-6).  Of those, Colorado Agricultural (now Colorado State University) was the only one that finished with a winning record (5-2-1).

Starting players on the 1922 Drake team included halfbacks Bill Boelter and Kenneth McLuen, quarterback Sam Orebaugh, center Peterson, guard Denton, and tackle Krueger. Boelter, Orebaugh, Denton, Peterson, and Krueger were selected as first-team players by at least one selector on the 1922 All-Missouri Valley Conference football team.

Schedule

References

Drake
Drake Bulldogs football seasons
Missouri Valley Conference football champion seasons
College football undefeated seasons
Drake Bulldogs football